Andrés Pacheco (1550–1626) was a Spanish churchman and theologian.

Biography

Andrés Pacheco was born in La Puebla de Montalbán on April 5, 1550.  His father was Alonso Pacheco y Téllez-Girón, Lord of La Puebla de Montalbánm, who was a Knight of the Order of Santiago and commander of Medina de las Torres.  His mother was Juana de Cárdenas, daughter of Alonso de Cárdenas, Conde of Puebla del Maestre.

He studied grammar, dialectic, philosophy, and theology at the University of Alcalá, graduating with a doctorate in theology.  Philip II of Spain named Pacheco tutor of his nephew Albert VII, Archduke of Austria, who later became a cardinal and Governor of the Habsburg Netherlands.  Pacheco later became Abbot of San Vicente de la Sierra (connected to the Cathedral of Toledo) and of then of the Cathedral of Alcalá de Henares (1584–87).

On December 2, 1587, the cathedral chapter of the Segovia Cathedral elected Pacheco bishop of Segovia; during his time as bishop of Segovia, he held a diocesan synod.  He was translated on August 13, 1601, becoming Bishop of Cuenca.

Pacheco resigned his bishopric in 1622, the same year he was appointed Grand Inquisitor of Spain.  He was also Patriarch of the West Indies from 1625

Pacheco died on April 7, 1626.

References
 This page is based on this page on Spanish Wikipedia.

External links and additional sources
 (for Chronology of Bishops) 
 (for Chronology of Bishops) 

1550 births
1626 deaths
Grand Inquisitors of Spain
Bishops of Cuenca
16th-century Roman Catholic bishops in Spain
17th-century Roman Catholic bishops in Spain
16th-century Spanish Roman Catholic theologians
17th-century Spanish Roman Catholic theologians